The Indecent Woman or  De onfatsoenlijke vrouw  is a 1991 Dutch erotic thriller film directed by Ben Verbong.

Cast
José Way	... 	Emilia
Coen van Vrijberghe de Coningh	... 	Charles
Huub Stapel	... 	Leon
Lydia van Nergena	... 	Anna
Marieke van Leeuwen	... 	Simone
Theo de Groot	... 	Marcel
Peter Bolhuis	... 	Brig. Vermeulen
Niels Wolf	... 	bewaker
Peter Smits	... 	verpleegkundige
Aga de Wit	... 	buurvrouw
Regina General	... 	tweelingzus
Roos General	... 	tweelingzus
Aukje Jetten	... 	Alice
Earl van Es	... 	antiliaan
Jack Wouterse	... 	getatoueerde man

External links 
 

1991 films
1990s Dutch-language films
1990s erotic thriller films
Films directed by Ben Verbong
Dutch erotic thriller films